Jerrauld Corey Jones (born July 22, 1954) is an American politician and jurist. He was a Democratic member of the Virginia House of Delegates 1988-2002, representing the 89th District in Norfolk. He is currently a judge of the Norfolk Circuit Court.

Early life

Jones' father was a prominent African-American lawyer in Norfolk during the 1950s, the era of massive resistance to school integration in Virginia. In 1961, young Jerrauld became one of the first African-American students at his elementary school. In 1967, he went on to integrate the private Virginia Episcopal School in Lynchburg.

Jones received a B.A. degree cum laude from Princeton University in 1976. In 1980 he graduated from the Washington and Lee University School of Law with a J.D. degree. That same year, he became the first African-American law clerk to the Supreme Court of Virginia.  He subsequently returned to Norfolk and served as an Assistant Commonwealth's Attorney for two years before opening up a private law practice.  He remained in private practice until 2002, when he became Director of Juvenile Justice.

Political career
In 1987, Jones was elected to the Virginia House of Delegates from the 89th District when the incumbent, Yvonne Miller, chose to run for the state senate instead. He was reelected seven times, and eventually became a member of the Rules Committee.

In 2001, Jones ran in the Democratic primary for Lieutenant Governor of Virginia. He finished third behind the eventual winner, Richmond Mayor Tim Kaine, and Delegate Alan Diamonstein of Newport News. Following this defeat, he ran for reelection to the House, winning his eighth term in November.

In June 2002, Governor Mark Warner appointed Jones state Director of Juvenile Justice until 2005.  In this capacity he oversaw all adjudicated youths in the juvenile detention system in Virginia.

Judicial career
In 2005, then-Governor Warner appointed Jones a judge of the Norfolk Juvenile and Domestic Relations Court. In December 2008, Governor Kaine appointed him to fill a vacancy on the Norfolk Circuit Court.  Jones was elected to a full 8-year term by the legislature during the 2009 General Assembly session and re-elected for a second 8-year term during the 2017 General Assembly session.

Notes

External links
Virginia Public Access Project: Jerrauld C Jones

1954 births
Living people
African-American state legislators in Virginia
Democratic Party members of the Virginia House of Delegates
Princeton University alumni
Washington and Lee University School of Law alumni
Politicians from Norfolk, Virginia
20th-century American politicians
21st-century American politicians
21st-century American judges
Virginia circuit court judges